Sir Stanley Seymour Argyle KBE, MRCS, LRCP (4 December 1867 – 23 November 1940), was an Australian doctor, radiologist, businessman, and politician. Argyle was the former Leader of the Opposition, Treasurer and Premier of Victoria, achieving the latter in May 1932, following the 1932 Victorian state election.

Early life
Argyle was born in Kyneton, Colony of Victoria in 1867 to Edward Argyle, a grazier from England, and Mary Cook. He was educated at the Kyneton School, Hawthorn Grammar School, and Brighton Grammar School before attending Trinity College at the University of Melbourne, where he graduated in medicine. He went on to study bacteriology at King's College London.

Political career
After further study in the United Kingdom, he went into general practice in Kew, and was later a pioneer of radiology in Australia. He was a member of the Kew City Council from 1898 to 1905 and was mayor from in 1903 to 1905. During World War I, he was consultant radiologist to the Australian Imperial Force in Egypt and in France, retiring with the rank of Lieutenant-Colonel. After the war, he returned to medical practice at the Alfred Hospital in Melbourne. He invested in dairy farming, milk processing and citrus growing.
 
In 1920, Argyle was elected to the Victorian Legislative Assembly for the seat of Toorak  as an independent Nationalist. Between 1923 and 1928, he was Chief Secretary and Minister for Health in the ministries of Harry Lawson, John Allan, Alexander Peacock and William McPherson. When McPherson resigned as leader of the Nationalist Party, Argyle was chosen to succeed him and, in 1931, the party was renamed the United Australia Party (UAP). He led the opposition to Ned Hogan's minority Labor Party government, which was unable to cope with the effects of the Great Depression and was heavily defeated at the May 1932 elections.

Argyle formed a coalition government with the Country Party, led by Allan and later by Albert Dunstan. The government had a huge majority – 45 seats to Labor's 16. Ministers included the rising star of the UAP, Robert Menzies, who became Deputy Premier, Attorney-General and Minister for Railways. Argyle, a firm fiscal conservative, held to the orthodox view that in a time of depression government spending must be cut so that the budget remained in balance. This soon brought him into conflict with both the trade unions and the farmers, but at the time there seemed to be no alternative policy. Argyle was lucky in that the economy began to improve from 1932, and the unemployment rate fell from 27 percent in 1932 to 20 percent in 1934 and 14 percent in 1935. That led a reduction in unemployment relief payments and an increase in taxation revenue, easing the state's financial crisis.

Argyle fought the March 1935 election with an improving economy and a record of sound, if unimaginative, management. With the Labor Party opposition still divided and demoralised, he was rewarded with another very comfortable majority for his coalition government. However, at that point he was unexpectedly betrayed by his Country Party allies. The Country Party leader, Albert Dunstan, was a close friend of the gambling boss John Wren, who was also very close to the Labor leader Tom Tunnecliffe (in the view of most historians, Tunnecliffe was, in fact, under Wren's control). Wren, aided by the Victorian Labor Party President, Arthur Calwell, persuaded Dunstan to break off the coalition with Argyle and form a minority Country Party government, which Labor would support in return for some policy concessions. Dunstan agreed to the deal and, in April 1935, he moved a successful no confidence vote in the government from which he had just resigned.

The UAP (and later its successor the Liberal Party) never forgave the Country Party for that treachery. Henry Bolte, later Victoria's longest-serving Premier, was 27 in 1935, and Dunstan's betrayal of Argyle lay behind his lifelong intense dislike of the Country Party, whom he called "political prostitutes".  Argyle remained in politics as Leader of the Opposition until his death in 1940.

In 1926, 1929 and 1939 Argyle attempted to pass a Mental Deficiency Bill which would charge and possibly kill sectors of the population such as homosexuals, those with smaller heads and Aboriginal Australians as they were deemed to be racially inferior. It was passed unanimously in 1939 but was not enacted after the change in opinion caused by the Nazi Holocaust.

Personal life
Argyle married Violet Ellen Jessie Lewis of "Spring Grove", Cotham Road, Kew at Holy Trinity Church, Kew on 24 January 1895. They had two sons and two daughters; the first of their children, Inez, was born on 2 November 1895. The next, Bessie Abbott, was born on 26 March 1897. Their elder son, Thomas Milner Stanley, was born on 11 October 1899; the younger, Hector Stanley, was born on 2 October 1901. The Argyles lived at Kew until 1919 when they purchased a property, "Halstead", at 29 Bruce Street, Toorak. In 1933, that house was demolished and a new one built to the design of architect Marcus Martin. After the death of her husband, Lady Argyle moved to Perth to be near her son Tom and his family.  She died in Perth in 1963 at the age of 94. By that time, three of her four children were living in Perth.

Stanley Argyle was a cousin of the British judge Michael Argyle.

Notes

References

Bibliography
Geoff Browne, A Biographical Register of the Victorian Parliament, 1900–84, Government Printer, Melbourne, 1985
Don Garden, Victoria: A History, Thomas Nelson, Melbourne, 1984
Kate White, John Cain and Victorian Labour 1917–1957, Hale and Iremonger, Sydney, 1982
Raymond Wright, A People's Counsel. A History of the Parliament of Victoria, 1856–1990, Oxford University Press, Melbourne, 1992
 

|-

1867 births
1940 deaths
People educated at Brighton Grammar School
People educated at Trinity College (University of Melbourne)
Melbourne Medical School alumni
Alumni of King's College London
Premiers of Victoria
Australian Knights Commander of the Order of the British Empire
Australian politicians awarded knighthoods
United Australia Party members of the Parliament of Victoria
Members of the Victorian Legislative Assembly
Treasurers of Victoria 
Australian radiologists
Medical doctors from Melbourne
Australian military doctors
Politicians from Melbourne
Leaders of the Opposition in Victoria (Australia)
People from Kyneton